Michael Edelson is a non-executive director of Manchester United F.C. He is an angel investor, venture capitalist and philanthropist who has been instrumental in creating numerous cash shell companies on both AIM and PLUS. As a result of these, he was nicknamed "The Shellmeister" by Richard Rivlin in an article in the Sunday Telegraph in 1996 and the nickname has stuck to this day.

Edelson was educated at Bury Grammar School and joined his family business upon leaving Sixth Form.

Biography 
Educated at Bury Grammar School, he was an amateur footballer playing for Oldham Athletic and Stoke City Reserves between 1960 and 1964 before joining the family business full-time in 1964. In the mid-1990s, he took a stake in Conrad Continental Limited, an ailing Manchester textile company that was listed on the London Stock Exchange. After the conversion of Conrad into a cash shell, Conrad successfully acquired Sheffield United F.C. via a reverse takeover and as a result a new route for companies to obtain a listing on a stock exchange had been created and Edelson's stock market career was launched.

In the late 1990s he was involved in a flurry of similar deals bringing to market larger companies such as Prestbury Group with Nigel Wray and Nick Leslau,The Pharmacy Restaurant in Notting Hill with Matthew Freud and Damien Hirst and most famously Knutsford where his co-investors were Julian Richer, Sir Archie Norman and again Wray and Leslau. Knutsford reached an amazing value of £1billion within a month of flotation and the Knutsford story is quoted in many business schools around the world.

He attracted many celebrity investors as he continued to float his shells, amongst them Alan Hansen, David Baddiel, Angus Deayton as well as numerous other sportsmen and even the investment arm of Her Majesty the Queen. His reputation for fairness and innovation has reaped rewards for many investors.

As a result of all of the transactions, he was dubbed "The Shellmeister" by City journalist Richard Rivlin in the Sunday Telegraph and the nickname stuck. He has now floated over 20 companies since Prestbury some of which have performed spectacularly as a result of having brought in budding entrepreneurs such as Abby Hardoon of Magic Moments and later Host Europe and Nick Robertson of ASOS.com. ASOS.com now has over 2,000 employees and is the United Kingdom's largest independent online and fashion beauty retailer.

He is also the chair of the AIM-listed company SysGroup PLC, which he originally founded, and remains on the board of a number of smaller private companies and charitable trusts.

Manchester United 
Edelson has been a non-executive Director of Manchester United F.C. since 1982. He was appointed to the board by Martin Edwards to replace Matt Busby, who had become club president earlier the same year. Edelson joined James Gulliver – who had built up the Edwards family meat business into the £4 billion Argyll Group – and Alan Gibson – the son of James Gibson, who was Manchester United's chairman from 1932 to 1951 and whose loans saved the club from extinction.

Edelson was one of the founder members of the Manchester United Foundation and remains a trustee on the Foundation's Board as well as being involved in a number of other charities.

Miss World 
In 1980 Edelson was invited by Eric Morley to become a judge for the Miss World Pageant and he went on to become one of the few people to have judged three times. Over the coming years, together with Morley he adjudicated alongside fellow judges such as Shirley Bassey, Plácido Domingo, Susan George, Bruce Forsyth as well as Dodi Fayed before Fayed died along with Princess Diana in a car crash in Paris in August 1997.

Publications
 Manchester United and M.E. (December 2020)

References

Living people
Manchester United F.C. directors and chairmen
1944 births
People educated at Bury Grammar School